The Anchor Buggy was a short-lived United States automobile manufacturer; the high wheeler was manufactured by the Anchor Buggy and Carriage Company in Cincinnati, Ohio, United States, in 1910 and 1911.

An 1890 advertisement for the Anchor Buggy Company featured an optical illusion; when viewed one way the image looked like a young woman, when viewed another way the image looked like an old woman.

References

External links
The Anchor Buggy and Carriage Company Connection

Brass Era vehicles
Defunct motor vehicle manufacturers of the United States
Motor vehicle manufacturers based in Ohio
Defunct companies based in Cincinnati
Vehicle manufacturing companies established in 1910
1910 establishments in Ohio
Vehicle manufacturing companies disestablished in 1911
1911 disestablishments in Ohio

Highwheeler
1910s cars